The 1961 Cork Intermediate Hurling Championship was the 52nd staging of the Cork Intermediate Hurling Championship since its establishment by the Cork County Board in 1909.

On 8 October 1961, Glen Rovers won the championship following a 4–06 to 1–06 defeat of Castletownroche in a replay of the final at Riverstown Sportsfield. This was their sixth championship title overall and their first title since 1958.

Results

Final

References

Cork Intermediate Hurling Championship
Cork Intermediate Hurling Championship